"Spiders" is a song by Armenian-American heavy metal band System of a Down from their self-titled debut album. The song was featured on the Scream 3 soundtrack and in the video game Rock Band 4.

Music
"Spiders", like many of System of a Down's songs, is written in the key of C minor. The song relies heavily on the Cm, B♭, and E♭ chords, as well as Fm, Gm, A♭, B, and D♭. "Spiders" uses 4/4 time at a slow tempo, and employs drum-rolls and syncopation in the verses. The music can be described as haunting, ominous, dark, frightening, and depressing with its dark melody and echoing vocal overdubs. Serj Tankian's vocals, while low and melodic in the verses, become more energetic and dissonant in the refrains. The song's minor-key intro serves as a musical motif for the rest of the song; it repeats throughout the song in its normal and raised third forms. After the second refrain, Daron Malakian delivers a solo bridge that creates harmonic tension with its B and D♭ (non-key) chords. The song ends with a soft vocal version of the intro motif.

Music video
A music video was directed by Charlie Deaux. Recently, a second version of the video has surfaced on video sharing websites such as YouTube, featuring a more coherent timeline and more footage of the band compared to the other actors.

As of January 2023, the song has 115 million views on YouTube.

Track listing

Chart positions

References

External links
 Song lyrics

System of a Down songs
1999 singles
1998 songs
Song recordings produced by Rick Rubin
Songs written by Daron Malakian
Songs written by Serj Tankian